Michałowice may refer to the following places in Poland:
Michałowice, Kłodzko County in Lower Silesian Voivodeship (south-west Poland)
Michałowice, Strzelin County in Lower Silesian Voivodeship (south-west Poland)
Michałowice, Gmina Długołęka in Lower Silesian Voivodeship (south-west Poland)
Michałowice, Gmina Sobótka in Lower Silesian Voivodeship (south-west Poland)
Michałowice, Łódź Voivodeship (central Poland)
Michałowice, Lesser Poland Voivodeship (south Poland)
Michałowice, Świętokrzyskie Voivodeship (south-central Poland)
Michałowice, Grójec County in Masovian Voivodeship (east-central Poland)
Michałowice, Pruszków County in Masovian Voivodeship (east-central Poland)
Michałowice, Opole Voivodeship (south-west Poland)

See also 
 Michalovice (disambiguation)